The 2000 Milton Keynes Council election took place on 4 May 2000 to elect members of Milton Keynes Council (a unitary authority) in Buckinghamshire, England. One third of the council was up for election and the council stayed under no overall control.

After the election, the composition of the council was
Labour 22
Liberal Democrat 20
Conservative 8
Independent 1

Campaign
The Labour Prime Minister Tony Blair came to Milton Keynes to launch his party's local election campaign. Labour were defending control of Milton Keynes council, but before the election were relying on the casting vote of the mayor to keep control, after 2 Labour councillors left the party to become independents.

The election in Milton Keynes saw a relaxation of the rules for requesting a postal vote, allowing anyone who wanted to vote by post. As a results the number of postal vote requests increased from the normal 1,100 to 3,600.

Election result
The results saw no party win a majority on the council, with Labour losing seats, including 3 to the Conservatives.

Ward results

References

2000 English local elections
2000
2000s in Buckinghamshire